WEOM-LP (103.1 FM, "Miracle 103.1") is a radio station licensed to Thomasville, North Carolina, United States, and serving the Piedmont Triad area. The station is currently owned by World Evangelistic Outreach Ministries, Inc. It airs a Gospel music format.

The station was assigned the WEOM-LP call letters by the Federal Communications Commission on March 28, 2003. The station changed its call sign to WTZO-LP on September 1, 2013, and back to WEOM-LP on August 1, 2015.

References

External links
 

EOM-LP
Gospel radio stations in the United States
Radio stations established in 2003
EOM-LP